Short deck may refer to:

 Short-deck hold 'em, a variant of poker
 Stripped deck, a set of playing cards smaller than a full pack or deck